Michel Espinosa (born 15 September 1993) is a Cameroonian-born French professional footballer who plays as a midfielder for Challenger Pro League club Virton. Espinosa is a French youth international.

Club career
Espinosa started his career in the youth ranks of Toulouse FC where he spent seven seasons, but did not make it into the professional team. He moved to Trélissac in 2014 and spent a year there, before signing an amateur contract with Clermont. He made his Ligue 2 debut for the club in the first game of the 2015–16 Ligue 2 season, on 31 July 2015, in a 0–0 draw against Sochaux. He signed his first professional contract with the club on 3 November 2015.

Espinosa left Clermont in January 2018, signing for Laval in Championnat National until the end of the 2017–18 season. He was not retained at the end of his contract, and signed for Croatian side Istra 1961.

In June 2019, Espinosa signed a two-year contract with Lyon-Duchère.

In October 2021, he joined Dinamo București until the end of the season, with the option for an extension.

Espinosa joined Belgian Challenger Pro League club Virton on 9 August 2022 after a successful trial.

References

External links
 
 

1993 births
Living people
People from Yaoundé
Association football midfielders
French footballers
Cameroonian footballers
France youth international footballers
French sportspeople of Cameroonian descent
Ligue 2 players
Championnat National players
Championnat National 2 players
Championnat National 3 players
Croatian Football League players
Liga I players
Toulouse FC players
Trélissac FC players
Clermont Foot players
Stade Lavallois players
NK Istra 1961 players
Lyon La Duchère players
Botev Plovdiv players
FC Dinamo București players
R.E. Virton players
Expatriate footballers in Croatia
French expatriate sportspeople in Croatia
Cameroonian expatriate sportspeople in Croatia
Expatriate footballers in Bulgaria
French expatriate sportspeople in Bulgaria
Expatriate footballers in Romania
French expatriate sportspeople in Romania
Cameroonian expatriate sportspeople in Romania
French expatriate sportspeople in Belgium
Cameroonian expatriate sportspeople in Belgium